Reedsville is a census-designated place (CDP) in the Kishacoquillas Valley of Mifflin County, Pennsylvania, United States. The population was 641 at the 2010 census. Reedsville has a high Amish population.

General information
ZIP code: 17084
Area code: 717
Local telephone exchange: 667

Geography

Reedsville is located north of the center of Mifflin County at  (40.662470, -77.595962). It lies along Kishacoquillas Creek at the north end of Mann Narrows, a water gap where the creek cuts through Jacks Mountain.

Demographics
As of the census of 2000, there were 850 people, 324 households, and 226 families residing in the CDP. The population density was 313.2 people per square mile (120.9/km2). There were 346 housing units at an average density of 126.3/sq mi (48.8/km2). The racial makeup of the CDP was 99.53% White 0.23% Asian, and 0.23% from two or more races.

There were 324 households, out of which 29.3% had children under the age of 18 living with them, 57.7% were married couples living together, 9.0% had a female householder with no husband present, and 30.2% were non-families. 24.1% of all households were made up of individuals, and 12.7% had someone living alone who was 65 years of age or older. The average household size was 2.47 and the average family size was 2.94.

In the CDP, the population was spread out, with 22.1% under the age of 18, 6.1% from 18 to 24, 28.2% from 25 to 44, 22.7% from 45 to 64, and 20.9% who were 65 years of age or older. The median age was 40 years. For every 100 females, there were 92.4 males. For every 100 females age 18 and over, there were 88.7 males.

The median income for a household in the CDP was $30,833, and the median income for a family was $32,583. Males had a median income of $25,481 versus $20,938 for females. The per capita income for the CDP was $13,591. About 4.4% of families and 5.0% of the population were below the poverty line, including none of those under age 18 and 10.1% of those age 65 or over.

Geology
The Reedsville Formation is named after this town.

Schools
Reedsville is part  of the Mifflin County School District:

Brown Township Elementary School (now closed)
Indian Valley Elementary/Intermediate School (was formerly Indian Valley Middle School; before that it was Kishacoquillas High School)

References

Census-designated places in Mifflin County, Pennsylvania
Census-designated places in Pennsylvania